Britain From Above is a 2008 six-part British television miniseries in which journalist Andrew Marr takes to the skies over Britain to research aspects of past and present British life and the interconnections that make Britain what it is today. The series is described by the BBC as "An epic journey revealing the secrets, patterns and hidden rhythms of our lives from a striking new perspective". According to the BBC, "Cutting edge technology allows you to see through cloud cover, navigate the landscape and witness familiar sights as never seen before."

The series was filmed in High Definition and aired on BBC One, Two and Four for three weeks starting 10 August 2008 and is repeated regularly. The official website features all the films from the programmes, exclusive material including Rewinds through time at 16 different locations, Rough Cuts of magic moments and Behind the Scenes. The site also shows aerial images by photographer Jason Hawkes.

Episode list

References

External links 
 
 

2008 British television series debuts
Aviation television series
2008 British television series endings
2000s British documentary television series
BBC television documentaries
English-language television shows